In chemistry, furantetracarboxylic acid is an organic compound with formula , or (C4O)(-(CO)OH)4, which can be viewed as deriving from furan  through replacement of the four hydrogen atoms by carboxyl functional groups -(CO)OH.

By removal of four protons, the acid is expected to yield the anion , furantetracarboxylate, which is one of the oxocarbon anions (consisting solely of oxygen and carbon. The same names are used for the corresponding esters.

The acid can be obtained by from dioxalylsuccinate.

The salt rubidium  trihydrogenfurantetracarboxylate  crystallizes as white needles.

See also
 Methanetetracarboxylic acid  
 Ethylenetetracarboxylic acid 
 Benzoquinonetetracarboxylic acid

References

Furans
Carboxylic acids